Mish-mash (in Bulgarian: Миш-маш) is a Bulgarian spring dish made with fresh vegetables (typically tomatoes, peppers and onions), eggs and sirene (a type of Balkan brined cheese), and often garnished with freshly cut parsley. 
There are variations in which garlic, scallions, eggplant, okra or carrots are added to the dish. There are variations without sirene and without onion as well.

Preparation, serving and consumption
Traditionally, mish-mash is made from chopped peppers and tomatoes, which are stewed in hot oil over medium heat. Peppers can be pre-roasted and peeled or cut raw. After that, eggs and feta cheese are added to the mixture to thicken. Parsley is added last, just before putting the mish-mash off heat. It is also possible to prepare the dish in the oven.
It is sometimes convenient to prepare the stewed vegetables beforehand and just add eggs and cheese before consumption.

There is no one recipe for making mish-mash, and many different variations of the dish exist.  However, common ingredients are listed below:

 Eggs
 Sirene
 Onions
 Tomatoes
 Bell peppers
 Sunflower oil / Vegetable oil / Butter
 Garlic
 Parsley
 Black pepper
 Salt

The dish is usually served warm, as an appetizer or a main dish, often with fresh bread.

See also
 List of vegetable dishes
 List of egg dishes
 Bulgarian cuisine

References 

Bulgarian cuisine
Vegetable dishes
Stews
Vegetarian cuisine